Guyana competed in the 2019 Parapan American Games in Lima, Peru from 23 August to 1 September. This was Guyana's first appearance at the Parapan American Games.

Table tennis

Guyana will represent one male table tennis player.

See also
Guyana at the 2019 Pan American Games

References

2019 in Guyanese sport
Guyana at the Pan American Games
Nations at the 2019 Parapan American Games